Enrico Alberti (born 24 May 1947 in Cortina d'Ampezzo, Italy) is an Italian curler.

At the national level, he is a 1982 Italian men's champion curler.

Teams

References

External links
 

Living people
1947 births
People from Cortina d'Ampezzo
Italian male curlers
Italian curling champions
Sportspeople from the Province of Belluno